Looney Tunes Super Stars' Bugs Bunny: Hare Extraordinaire is a DVD of 15 new-to-DVD Bugs Bunny cartoons released on August 10, 2010. Along with Daffy Duck: Frustrated Fowl, these two DVDs are the successor to the Looney Tunes Golden Collection series. None of the cartoons featured in this DVD were previously found on the Golden Collection sets.

Contents 
 All cartoons on this disc star Bugs Bunny.

(^) - Cropped to widescreen.

Controversies 
This was one of two first Looney Tunes Super Stars that released the majority of some of the cartoons but in a 1:85 widescreen format. Warner Bros. has stated the reason for this was because that was how the post-1953 cartoons were shown in theaters, which made many collectors upset as cartoons were filmed in Academy full-screened ratio, not widescreen.

In 2011 Bedevilled Rabbit, Mad as a Mars Hare and Dr. Devil and Mr. Hare were re-released as part of the Looney Tunes Platinum Collection: Volume 1 DVD and Blu-Ray set presenting them in their original 4:3 aspect ratios. In 2020 Lumber Jack-Rabbit, Napoleon Bunny-Part, From Hare to Heir, The Million Hare and False Hare were included as part of the Bugs Bunny 80th Anniversary Collection Blu-Ray and were once again presented in their original 4:3 aspect ratios.

References 

Looney Tunes home video releases